Israel Hamilton was appointed United States Attorney for the District of Ohio by Martin Van Buren in 1839. He served for two years.

Israel Hamilton was born in Massachusetts and educated at Brown University. He was born April 14, 1799. After college, he taught school in Abbeville, South Carolina. He came to Urbana, Champaign County, Ohio in 1828.

He was first elected in 1832 as Fence Viewer. Hamilton was a Whig when he first came west, but became an active Democrat. Martin Van Buren, of that party, appointed him United States Attorney in 1839, and he served until Whig William Henry Harrison chose Charles Anthony.

Hamilton died in the fall of 1842. He is buried at Oak Dale Cemetery in Urbana.

Notes

References

1799 births
1842 deaths
United States Attorneys for the District of Ohio
People from Urbana, Ohio
People from Massachusetts
Brown University alumni